Steenstrup may refer to any of the following people:

 Carl Steenstrup (1934-2014), a Danish translator of several works of Japanese literature
 Hjalmar Steenstrup (1890-1945), a Norwegian insurance agent and Milorg pioneer and intelligence agent
 Japetus Steenstrup (1813–1897), a Danish zoologist, biologist and professor
 K. J. V. Steenstrup (1842-1906), a Danish geologist
 Paul Steenstrup Koht (1844–1892), a Norwegian educator and politician for the Liberal Party
 Peter Severin Steenstrup (1807-1863), a Norwegian naval officer and businessperson
 Poul Steenstrup (1772–1864), a Danish mining supervisor and politician

Danish-language surnames